E with diaeresis (Ӭ ӭ; italics: Ӭ ӭ) is a letter of the Cyrillic script. Its form is derived from the Cyrillic letter E (Э э Э э).

E with diaeresis is used in the alphabet of the Kildin Sami language, where it represents the close-mid front unrounded vowel , following a palatalized (sometimes called "half-palatalized") stop, . In Moksha, it was used for the near-open front unrounded vowel , however, in contemporary Moksha it has been replaced by Я or word-initially by Э.

Computing codes

See also
Ë ë : Latin letter Ë
Ё ё : Cyrillic letter Yo
Cyrillic characters in Unicode

References

Cyrillic letters with diacritics
Letters with diaeresis